Ayodeji Ayeni (born 24 February 1972) is a Nigerian football coach and former player who is currently the head coach of Nigeria Professional Football League club Akwa United.

Coaching career
Ayeni's first head coach role at a top-flight club came in June 2021, when he joined Sunshine Stars from Ekiti United who were in the NNL at the time.

On 24 March 2022, Ayeni moved to Akwa United to replace Kennedy Boboye, who had quit the club on 14 February 2022 after a poor run of results. His first game as Akwa United boss, a Nigeria Professional Football League fixture against Rivers United at Godswill Akpabio Stadium on 2 April 2022, ended 1–1. He recorded his first win as manager of the Uyo club with a 2–1 victory over Shooting Stars on 11 April 2022.

Honours

Individual
 Nigeria Professional Football League Coach of the Month: April 2022

References

Nigerian sports coaches
Nigerian football managers
People from Osun State
People from Ilesha
Living people
1972 births